NOWA or Nowa may refer to:
Nowa, Lower Silesian Voivodeship (SW Poland)
Independent Publishing House NOWA
Northwest Outdoor Writers Association